The Sykesville Historic District encompasses the center of Sykesville, Maryland. Sykesville is a small incorporated town in the Patapsco River valley in southern Carroll County, Maryland, and is located on the old main line of the Baltimore and Ohio Railroad (B&O), one of the first railroad lines in the United States, that section dating from 1831. The B&O train station is included in the district, next to the river. It was designed by E. Francis Baldwin in the Queen Anne style and built in 1883. It is currently a restaurant having outdoor seating on the original platform (only goods trains now pass). Other historically significant buildings in the district were built between the 1850s and the 1920s.

See also
Salopha (Sykesville, Maryland)

References

External links
, including photo in 2002, at Maryland Historical Trust
Sykesville Historic District boundary map
Town of Sykesville Website, Carroll County, includes history of Sykesville up to July 12, 2012

Sykesville Historic District Nomination Form from Maryland State Archives

Historic districts on the National Register of Historic Places in Maryland
Queen Anne architecture in Maryland
Colonial Revival architecture in Maryland
Historic districts in Carroll County, Maryland
Sykesville, Maryland
National Register of Historic Places in Carroll County, Maryland